Skjoldastraumen is a village in Tysvær municipality in Rogaland county, Norway. The village lies on one of the narrowest parts of the fjord, where there is a set of locks on the fjord to raise and lower boats. The village is the site of the Skjoldastraumen Church.

References

Villages in Rogaland
Tysvær